The Boeing Passenger Air Vehicle (PAV) is an American electrical powered autonomous personal air vehicle prototype developed by the Boeing NeXt division of Boeing with the assistance of Aurora Flight Sciences.

Development 

Boeing subsidiary Aurora Flight Sciences designed an electric VTOL prototype, developing it to prototype by 2019. First, a model 1:10 was used to test the concept; it was flown with and without a fuselage. Further flight tests, with a 1:4 scale concept aircraft, were also conducted by Aurora.

The PAV first flew on January 22, 2019, in Manassas, Virginia, hovering before further tests and a transition to forward flight.

By September 2020, Boeing was to close its Boeing NeXt division, in response to financial losses in the wake of the 737 MAX groundings and the impact of the COVID-19 pandemic on aviation.

Design

The three-surface aircraft has twin booms each supporting four lift rotors slightly angled alternatively outward and inwards, a pusher propeller and the rear wing has vertical surfaces at each end.

Accident 

On June 4, 2019, the PAV crashed during its 5th test flight. Boeing representatives declined to disclose details of the crash.

During the flight test engineers noted some brief data dropouts and abnormal motor speeds, and decided to terminate the flight. The pilot entered the autoland command, and after a small descent, the aircraft motors went to idle and the aircraft impacted the runway. The aircraft was substantially damaged. A review of the recorded data revealed that vibration occurred and briefly exceeded the jerk logic threshold used to detect contacts to the ground (in addition to squat switches). The aircraft entered the ground mode, subsequently commanding the motors to shutdown.

Specifications (PAV)

See also
 Air taxi
 Flying car (aircraft)

References

External links 

 
 

2010s United States experimental aircraft
Electric aircraft
Boeing aircraft
Electric helicopters
Aircraft first flown in 2019
Urban air mobility
EVTOL aircraft
Boeing eVTOL